Calophasidia is a genus of moths of the family Noctuidae. The genus was erected by George Hampson in 1908.

Species
 Calophasidia cana (Turner, 1939)
 Calophasidia dentifera Hampson, 1909
 Calophasidia dichroa (Hampson, 1926)
 Calophasidia latens (Turner, 1929)
 Calophasidia lucala (Swinhoe, 1902)
 Calophasidia radiata (Swinhoe, 1902)

References

Hadeninae